The Hi-Mount Historic District is a historic neighborhood located two miles north of downtown Raleigh, North Carolina, United States. The eleven-block district, developed between 1938 and 1951, is one of the city's best-preserved twentieth century speculative neighborhoods.  The district encompasses 168 contributing buildings and 1 contributing site. Most of Hi-Mount's homes are Minimal Traditional in style, followed by Cape Cod and Ranch homes with sparse detailing. A small number of developers were involved with the district and the district also benefited from government housing financing programs such as the Federal Housing Administration and the Veteran's Administration, resulting in architectural consistency throughout the neighborhood.

It was listed on the National Register of Historic Places in 2011.

See also
 List of Registered Historic Places in North Carolina

References

External links
 National Register Historic Districts in Raleigh, North Carolina, RHDC
 Hi-Mount Historic District, RHDC

Houses on the National Register of Historic Places in North Carolina
Historic districts on the National Register of Historic Places in North Carolina
Neighborhoods in Raleigh, North Carolina
National Register of Historic Places in Raleigh, North Carolina
Houses in Raleigh, North Carolina